Paleobiology (or palaeobiology) is an interdisciplinary field that combines the methods and findings found in both the earth sciences and the life sciences. Paleobiology is not to be confused with geobiology, which focuses more on the interactions between the biosphere and the physical Earth.

Paleobiological research uses biological field research of current biota and of fossils millions of years old to answer questions about the molecular evolution and the evolutionary history of life. In this scientific quest, macrofossils, microfossils and trace fossils are typically analyzed. However, the 21st-century biochemical analysis of DNA and RNA samples offers much promise, as does the biometric construction of phylogenetic trees.

An investigator in this field is known as a paleobiologist.

Important research areas
Paleobotany applies the principles and methods of paleobiology to flora, especially green land plants, but also including the fungi and seaweeds (algae). See also mycology, phycology and dendrochronology.
Paleozoology uses the methods and principles of paleobiology to understand fauna, both vertebrates and invertebrates.  See also vertebrate and invertebrate paleontology, as well as paleoanthropology.
Micropaleontology applies paleobiologic principles and methods to archaea, bacteria, protists and microscopic pollen/spores.  See also microfossils and palynology.
Paleovirology examines the evolutionary history of viruses on paleobiological timescales.
Paleobiochemistry uses the methods and principles of organic chemistry to detect and analyze molecular-level evidence of ancient life, both microscopic and macroscopic.
Paleoecology examines past ecosystems, climates, and geographies so as to better comprehend prehistoric life.
Taphonomy analyzes the post-mortem history (for example, decay and decomposition) of an individual organism in order to gain insight on the behavior, death and environment of the fossilized organism.
Paleoichnology analyzes the tracks, borings, trails, burrows, impressions, and other trace fossils left by ancient organisms in order to gain insight into their behavior and ecology.
Stratigraphic paleobiology studies long-term secular changes, as well as the (short-term) bed-by-bed sequence of changes, in  organismal characteristics and behaviors.  See also stratification, sedimentary rocks and the geologic time scale.
Evolutionary developmental paleobiology examines the evolutionary aspects of the modes and trajectories of growth and development in the evolution of life – clades both extinct and extant. See also adaptive radiation, cladistics, evolutionary biology, developmental biology and phylogenetic tree.

Paleobiologists
The founder or "father" of modern paleobiology was Baron Franz Nopcsa (1877 to 1933), a Hungarian scientist trained at the University of Vienna. He initially termed the discipline "paleophysiology."

However, credit for coining the word paleobiology itself should go to Professor Charles Schuchert. He proposed the term in 1904 so as to initiate "a broad new science" joining "traditional paleontology with the evidence and insights of geology and isotopic chemistry."

On the other hand, Charles Doolittle Walcott, a Smithsonian adventurer, has been cited as the "founder of Precambrian paleobiology." Although best known as the discoverer of the mid-Cambrian Burgess shale animal fossils, in 1883 this American curator found the "first Precambrian fossil cells known to science" – a stromatolite reef then known as Cryptozoon algae. In 1899 he discovered the first acritarch fossil cells, a Precambrian algal phytoplankton he named Chuaria. Lastly, in 1914, Walcott reported "minute cells and chains of cell-like bodies" belonging to Precambrian purple bacteria.

Later 20th-century paleobiologists have also figured prominently in finding Archaean and Proterozoic eon microfossils: In 1954, Stanley A. Tyler and Elso S. Barghoorn described 2.1 billion-year-old cyanobacteria and fungi-like microflora at their Gunflint Chert fossil site. Eleven years later, Barghoorn and J. William Schopf reported finely-preserved Precambrian microflora at their Bitter Springs site of the Amadeus Basin, Central Australia.

In 1993, Schopf discovered O2-producing blue-green bacteria at his 3.5 billion-year-old Apex Chert site in Pilbara Craton, Marble Bar, in the northwestern part of Western Australia. So paleobiologists were at last homing in on the origins of the Precambrian "Oxygen catastrophe."

During the early part of the 21st-century, two paleobiologists Anjali Goswami and Thomas Halliday, studied the evolution of mammaliaforms during the Mesozoic and Cenozoic eras (between 299 million to 12,000 years ago).  Additionally, they uncovered and studied the morphological disparity and rapid evolutionary rates of living organisms near the end and in the aftermath of the Cretaceous mass extinction (145 million to 66 million years ago).

Paleobiologic journals
 Acta Palaeontologica Polonica
 Biology and Geology
 Historical Biology
 PALAIOS
 Palaeogeography, Palaeoclimatology, Palaeoecology
 Paleobiology (journal)
 Paleoceanography

Paleobiology in the general press 
Books written for the general public on this topic include the following:

 The Rise and Reign of the Mammals: A New History, from the Shadow of the Dinosaurs to Us written by Steve Brusatte
 Otherlands: A Journey Through Earth's Extinct Worlds written by Thomas Halliday

See also

 History of biology
 History of paleontology
 History of invertebrate paleozoology
 Molecular paleontology
 Taxonomy of commonly fossilised invertebrates
 Treatise on Invertebrate Paleontology

Footnotes

 Derek E.G. Briggs and Peter R. Crowther, eds. (2003). Palaeobiology II. The second edition of an acclaimed British textbook.
 Robert L. Carroll (1998). Patterns and Processes of Vertebrate Evolution. Cambridge Paleobiology Series. Applies paleobiology to the adaptive radiation of fishes and quadrupeds.
 Matthew T. Carrano, Timothy Gaudin, Richard Blob, and John Wible, eds. (2006). Amniote Paleobiology: Perspectives on the Evolution of Mammals, Birds and Reptiles. This new book describes paleobiological research into land vertebrates of the Mesozoic and Cenozoic eras.
 Robert B. Eckhardt (2000). Human Paleobiology. Cambridge Studies in Biology and Evolutionary Anthropology. This book connects paleoanthropology and archeology to the field of paleobiology.
 Douglas H. Erwin (2006). Extinction:  How Life on Earth Nearly Ended 250 Million Years Ago.  Princeton: Princeton University Press. .  An investigation by a paleobiologist into the many theories as to what happened during the catastrophic Permian-Triassic transition.
 Brian Keith Hall and Wendy M. Olson, eds. (2003). Keywords and Concepts in Evolutionary Biology.
 David Jablonski, Douglas H. Erwin, and Jere H. Lipps (1996). Evolutionary Paleobiology. A fine American textbook.
 Masatoshi Nei and Sudhir Kumar (2000). Molecular Evolution and Phylogenetics. This text links DNA/RNA analysis to the evolutionary "tree of life" in paleobiology.
 Donald R. Prothero (2004). Bringing Fossils to Life: An Introduction to Paleobiology. An acclaimed book for the novice fossil-hunter and young adults.
 Mark Ridley, ed. (2004). Evolution. An anthology of analytical studies in paleobiology.
 Raymond Rogers, David Eberth, and Tony Fiorillo (2007). Bonebeds: Genesis, Analysis and Paleobiological Significance. A new book regarding the fossils of vertebrates, especially tetrapods on land during the Mesozoic and Cenozoic eras.
 Thomas J. M. Schopf, ed. (1972). Models in Paleobiology. A much-cited, seminal classic in the field discussing methodology and quantitative analysis.
 Thomas J.M. Schopf (1980). Paleoceanography. A later book by the noted paleobiologist. This text discusses ancient marine ecology.
 J. William Schopf (2001). Cradle of Life: The Discovery of Earth's Earliest Fossils.  Princeton: Princeton University Press. .  The use of biochemical and ultramicroscopic analysis to analyze microfossils of bacteria and archaea.
 Paul Selden and John Nudds (2005). Evolution of Fossil Ecosystems. A recent analysis and discussion of paleoecology.
 David Sepkoski. Rereading the Fossil Record: The Growth of Paleobiology as an Evolutionary Discipline (University of Chicago Press; 2012) 432 pages; A history since the mid-19th century, with a focus on the "revolutionary" era of the 1970s and early 1980s and the work of Stephen Jay Gould and David Raup.
 Paul Tasch (1980). Paleobiology of the Invertebrates. Applies statistics to the evolution of sponges, cnidarians, worms, brachiopods, bryozoa, mollusks, and arthropods.
 Shuhai Xiao and Alan J. Kaufman, eds. (2006). Neoproterozoic Geobiology and Paleobiology. New York: Springer Science+Business Media.  .  This new book describes research into the fossils of the earliest multicellular animals and plants, especially the Ediacaran period invertebrates and algae.
 Bernard Ziegler and R. O. Muir (1983). Introduction to Palaeobiology. A classic, British introductory textbook.

External links
 Paleobiology website of the National Museum of Natural History (Smithsonian) in Washington, D.C.
 The Paleobiology Database

 
Developmental biology
Evolutionary biology
Subfields of paleontology